Pop Tate may refer to:

 Pop Tate (Archie Comics), an Archie Comics character
 Pop Tate (baseball) (1860–1932), Major League Baseball catcher